The African Church is a Christian denomination that was established in the British colonial areas that would later become Nigeria in 1901. It was established after strong disagreements arose between the European leadership of the Anglican Church and the native African leadership. Following the installation of Bishop Samuel Ajayi Crowther (one of the foremost black African Leaders of the Anglican Church and translator of the Bible into the Yoruba language) as the head of Church of Nigeria, a number of African clerics obtained progressive education that did not however translate to advancement in the leadership of the Church. This led to schisms that finally led to the formation of the indigenous African Church.
African church hymn book 
Yoruba version 
Be published

Early history

The African Church is always remembered for leading a revolution. In 1901, one elder Jacob Kehinde Coker who was then called the People's Warden, led some people out of the Anglican church in protest over the ill treatment meted on Africans in the white dominated church. These revolutionaries protested the mode of worship, which had no regard for African musical instruments and the fact that people had to wear European clothes and sing only Western hymns.

The Church held its first service on 17 October 1901 by J.K Coker and a group of ministers that disagreed with the Anglican Church European leadership led by Bishop Turgwell then of St. Paul's Church. The church met at the Rose Cottage, Marina for its first service (this is the present site of Leventis Stores, Marina)

Relating the first worship experience at this young church in 1901, the Pa Coker in his unpublished biography wrote:

On Sunday, the 20th of October, 1901 the first divine services was held in Rose Cottage under a canopy. It was estimated that between 600 and 800 worshippers gathered at Rose Cottage for this memorable service. Some of those who had formed the church acted as the choir and Lay Preacher D. A. J. Oguntolu preached his first powerful sermon taking his text from Song of Solomon chapter 1 verse 6: "Don't look down upon me because I am black because the sun has tanned me,--my brothers were angry with me and made me work in the vineyard. I had no time to care for myself." (R.S.V) Mr. Oguntolu emphasized that Africans have been worshipping Christ as Europeans who were watching, guarding and guiding their customs, beliefs and mode of worship while they had neglected their own. He emphasized that Christ to Europeans was a European and to Africans he should be an African. He stressed that they had been sufficiently taught to know that Christianity should now become an African religion.

The Church in its early history faced persecution in the hands of the colonial led government in Lagos under the influence of the CMS Church (Anglican) from which it had broken away. Due to its inability to obtain land, it resorted to leasing land from influential members for five years and through this method built its first church in Lagos, the Bethel Church leased by B. A. Roberts, A. E. Coates and D. A. J. Oguntolu on Balogun street. The church was initially built in twenty eight days with three hundred and fifty pounds to accommodate 600 members. It was dedicated on 22 December 1901 by Rev. J. S. Williams, vicar of St. Jude's Church, Ebute-Metta (who later became Primate). A second church known as African Church, Salem was later separately incorporated and led expansion efforts separately. The merger of the Salem and Bethel parts of the Church was later made possible under the name, African Church Incorporated. Moves however to incorporate similar African Churches (specifically,United Native African Church (U.N.A.) and the United African Methodist Church (U.A.M.) ) nearly engulfed the African Churches in an internal crisis between 1927 and 1937. This effort was led by J.K Coker, a wealthy lay man often regarded as the father of African Independent Churches.  The major source of disagreement was polygamy, which was forbidden by the African Church for the clergy but was allowed by these other churches. The merger was scuttled and these churches survived distinctly from the African Church. The African Church however unlike the Anglican Church (of those days) did baptize offspring of polygamists and allowed its members to take traditional titles.

Establishment and structure

  
The African Church is presently led by His Eminence, Dr. Emmanuel Udofia although Archbishop Julius Olayinka Osayande Abbe illegally and ridiculously enthroned as factional Primate of The African Church precisely on Sunday, 22 March 2020 by a long retired primate of The Church, His Eminence, Abraham Onadotun Olumuyiwa Onanuga at The African, Arch Cathedral, 59, Broad Street, Lagos, the National Headquarters of the Church an act that is condemned both by the Christendom and laws guiding the process.

The African Church structure has the Primate who serves as the spiritual head and is also the head of the clergy, and the Lay President who is the head of the laity. Major decisions affecting the Church are taken by both the clergy and the laity. The highest governing body is the Conference. Since 1983 clergy are trained at the African Church College of Theology, which since 1992 has been affiliated with the University of Ibadan until recently. The Church has had several Primates in the past, it is spread all over Nigeria with seven Provinces comprising forty-seven Dioceses in every geopolitical zone of the country.

The church membership numbers about 2,080,000. It has 580 priests in 47 dioceses, primarily in Nigeria. Its individual parishes number 720. Church membership dropped as the rise of new day Pentecostal churches challenged older-established orders in Nigeria.

The Church runs several schools, two hospitals and some social centers and development projects. It publishes a guide for daily Bible reading (in English and Yoruba). The Church is widely popular in major cities outside Lagos, especially in Oyo, Ijebu, Ekiti, Ondo, Osun, Kwara, Kogi, Akwa Ibom, Cross River, Rivers, Benue and other areas. The Church is headquartered in Lagos, Lagos State; participates in the activities of the Christian Association of Nigeria and World Council of Churches.

Doctrine

The World Council of Churches enunciates the doctrine of the church as follows on its website.

In its doctrine and liturgy The African Church has remained close to the Anglican tradition. Its mission statement reads:

The African Church receives and accepts the Bible as the standard of its faith. She also accepts the Old Testament and the New Testament as being canonical, and sufficient for salvation. She accepts and believes in the Fatherhood of God and the Holy Trinity.

The church practices the sacraments of baptism and holy communion.

Unification

Efforts of ecumenism by unification talks  between the Anglican Communion in Nigeria (Church of Nigeria) led by its Primate, The Most Revd. Peter Akinola and the African Church due to their common historical/orthodox position on the allowance of non-celibate gay men in the priesthood have taken place. However the two churches differ on doctrines of marriage, burial of the dead, ministerial hierarchy and the authority of the clergy. The council considered a document entitled Anglican-African Conversations, which was jointly agreed to by leaders of both churches.

References

External links
The African Church website

Churches in Nigeria
Christian organizations established in 1901
Christian new religious movements
1901 establishments in the British Empire